In the south-west Indian Ocean, tropical cyclones form south of the equator and west of 90° E to the coast of Africa.

Warnings and nomenclature
In 1946, Réunion's first airstrip opened, then called Gillot, and now called Roland Garros Airport. In 1950, the first meteorological station on the island opened at the airport, operated by Météo-France (MFR). The agency began publishing annual reviews in the 1962–63 season. Each year, the Météo-France office (MFR) based on Réunion island issues warnings on tropical cyclones within the basin, which is defined as the waters of the Indian Ocean from the coast of Africa to 90° E, south of the equator. The agency issues the warnings as part of its role as a Regional Specialized Meteorological Center, designated as such in 1993 by the World Meteorological Organization. Intensities are estimated through the Dvorak technique, which utilizes images from satellites by the American National Oceanic and Atmospheric Administration.

The Joint Typhoon Warning Center – a joint United States Navy – United States Air Force task force – also issues tropical cyclone warnings for the region. Wind estimates from Météo-France and most other basins throughout the world are sustained over 10 minutes, while estimates from the United States-based Joint Typhoon Warning Center are sustained over 1 minute. 1-minute winds are about 1.12 times the amount of 10-minute winds.

If a tropical storm in the basin strengthens to attain 10 minute sustained winds of at least , the MFR classifies it as a tropical cyclone, equivalent to a hurricane or typhoon (a use of "tropical cyclone" which is more restrictive than the usual definition).

History of the basin
The first storm in the MFR database of the basin originated on January 11, 1848. In January 1960, the first named storm was Alix, and each subsequent year had a list of storm names. Beginning in 1967, satellites helped locate cyclones in the basin, and in the following year, the MFR began estimating storm intensities from the satellite images. By 1977, the agency was using the Dvorak technique on an unofficial basis, but officially adopted it in 1981. Originally, the basin only extended to 80° E, and while it was extended eastward to the current 90° E, a lack of satellite imagery initially made data uncertain east of 80° E. The World Meteorological Organization designated the MFR as a Regional Tropical Cyclones Advisory Centre in 1988, and upgraded it to a Regional Specialized Meteorological Center in 1993. In May 1998, two Europe-based Meteosat satellites began providing complete coverage of the basin. On July 1, 2002, the MFR shifted the cyclone year to begin on this date and end on June 30 of the following year; previously, the cyclone year began on August 1 and ended on the subsequent July 31. In 2003, the MFR extended their area of warning responsibility to 40°S, having previously been limited to 30°S. During 2011, MFR started a reanalysis project of all tropical systems between 1978 and 1998, with methods such as a Dvorak technique reanalysis and use of microwave imagery. Preliminary results from this reanalysis project include correcting an increasing trend in the number of very intense tropical cyclones in the basin since 1978. This also revealed a seemingly systematic underestimation of tropical cyclone intensities in the past.

Statistics
From the 1980–81 to the 2010–11 season, there was an average of 9.3 tropical storms each year in the basin. A tropical storm has 10-minute winds of at least . There are an average of five storms that become tropical cyclones, which have 10-minute winds of at least . The median start date for the season was November 17, and the median end date was April 20.

Climatology

Generally, the monsoon does not cross into the Mozambique Channel until December; as a result, storms rarely form there before that time. From 1948 to 2010, 94 tropical systems developed in the small body of water, of which about half made landfall. A survey in 2004 conducted by weather expert Gary Padgett found meteorologists split whether these storms should be classified as tropical or subtropical.

In an average year, ten tropical depressions or storms strike Madagascar, and most generally do not cause much damage. Occasionally, storms or their remnants enter the interior of southeastern Africa, bringing heavy rainfall to Zimbabwe.

Seasons

Before 1900

1900–1950

1950–1959

1959

1960s

1970s

1980s

1990s

2000s

2010s

2020s

See also

Tropical cyclone
Atlantic hurricane season
Pacific hurricane season
Pacific typhoon season
North Indian Ocean tropical cyclone
Australian region tropical cyclone
South Pacific tropical cyclone
South Atlantic tropical cyclone
Mediterranean tropical-like cyclone

Notes

References

 
Indian Ocean Southwest
Southwest Indian cyclone seasons